Tropidophora semilineata was a species of land snail with a gill and an operculum, a terrestrial gastropod mollusk in the family Pomatiidae. This species was endemic to Mayotte. It is now extinct.

References 

Tropidophora
Extinct gastropods
Taxonomy articles created by Polbot
Endemic fauna of Mayotte
Gastropods described in 1881